Nicholas Wilkinson  (born 15 March 1988) is a Norwegian politician. 
He was elected representative to the Storting for the period 2017–2021 for the Socialist Left Party.

Wilkinson settled in Oppegård. He also holds a British passport. He is openly gay.

References

1988 births
Living people
People from Oppegård
Norwegian people of English descent
Socialist Left Party (Norway) politicians
Members of the Storting
Akershus politicians
Norwegian LGBT politicians
21st-century Norwegian politicians